Michael Pustilnik is an American Magic: The Gathering player. His success include a win at Pro Tour Los Angeles 2001, two other Pro Tour top eights, and seven Grand Prix top eights. Pustilnik is one of six players who won a Pro Tour, a Grand Prix, and a Masters tournament.

Achievements

References

American Magic: The Gathering players
Living people
Year of birth missing (living people)
People from Brooklyn